Crazy, Stupid, Love is a 2011 American romantic comedy film directed by Glenn Ficarra and John Requa, written by Dan Fogelman and starring Steve Carell, Ryan Gosling, Julianne Moore, Emma Stone, Marisa Tomei and Kevin Bacon. It follows multiple characters in interconnected stories of love.

The film was released in the United States by Warner Bros. Pictures on July 29, 2011, grossing over $142 million against its $50 million budget and was well-received by critics. Gosling was nominated for the Golden Globe Award for Best Actor – Motion Picture Musical or Comedy for his performance.

Plot 
Cal Weaver is a middle-aged man whose wife Emily asks for a divorce after she reveals an affair she had with co-worker David Lindhagen. After moving into his own apartment, Cal begins frequenting an upscale bar, talking loudly about his divorce, until he attracts the attention of a young man named Jacob Palmer. Jacob, a womanizer who beds different women each night, was recently rejected by a woman named Hannah. Jacob takes pity on Cal and offers to teach him how to pick up women. After a few awkward attempts to talk to women, Cal seduces Kate at the bar. This experience gives Cal the confidence to approach other women, and Cal begins to emulate Jacob's example successfully.

Eventually, Cal and Emily reunite at their 13-year-old son Robbie's parent-teacher conference, where Emily is impressed by Cal's newfound confidence and fitted clothes. Their reunion goes well until Robbie's teacher is revealed as Kate, who shares with Emily that she and Cal have had sex. Cal inadvertently confesses to having sex with nine women since their separation and Emily leaves in disgust. Meanwhile, Hannah, a recent law school graduate, is offended by her boyfriend as he offered her a position as a permanent lawyer at his firm instead of proposing to her. She returns to the bar where she originally rejected Jacob's advances, finds him, and asks if he still wants to take her home. Jacob takes her back to his luxurious home, but instead of becoming physically intimate, they spend the night talking and laughing until they both fall asleep.

Cal and Emily's son Robbie makes numerous grand gestures to try to win the heart of Jessica Riley, his 17-year-old babysitter, who has a crush on Cal. At the advice of a classmate, Jessica takes nude photos of herself, intending to send them to Cal. Emily calls Cal under the guise of needing help with the house's pilot light, but Cal sees through the ruse. Realizing that she called just because she missed him, Cal decides to win her back. Jacob returns Cal's calls and asks for advice about being in a real relationship and meeting his girlfriend's parents. Jessica's mother discovers the naked photos and Jessica's father, Bernie, rushes to the Weaver residence to confront him about the photos, with Jessica in pursuit. Cal and his kids create a makeshift mini golf set in their backyard to remind Emily of their first date.

During the gathering, Jacob and Hannah show up at the house, and Hannah is revealed to be Cal and Emily's first daughter born to them right out of high school. Cal is appalled that Jacob is dating his daughter, and forbids her from seeing him. Bernie shows up and attacks Cal. Jessica arrives and tells her father that Cal knew nothing of the pictures. David arrives on the scene to return Emily's sweater from a previous date. When Jacob identifies him, he punches David in the face for the pain he caused Cal. Cal, Jacob, David, and Bernie then get into a scuffle which is soon broken up by the police. Cal starts spending time at the bar again and receives a visit from Jacob, who confesses that he is in love with Hannah and has begun to re-evaluate his life as a result. Cal replies that he is happy that Jacob is a changed man but does not approve of Jacob and Hannah's relationship, having seen Jacob's former lifestyle. Jacob resigns without harboring any ill feelings; rather, he expresses his respect for Cal and praises him for being a great father.

At Robbie's eighth grade graduation, Robbie is the salutatorian and gives a pessimistic speech about how he no longer believes in true love and soulmates. Cal stops him, and instead begins to recount his courtship with Emily to the audience, saying that, while he does not know if things will work out, he will never give up on Emily. With renewed faith, Robbie reaffirms his love for Jessica, to the audience's applause. After the ceremony, Cal gives Jacob and Hannah his blessing. Jessica gives Robbie an envelope containing the nude photos of herself that were originally intended for Cal to "get him through high school." Cal and Emily have a laugh talking about the events that have transpired the past year, and watching them from afar, Robbie smiles optimistically.

Cast

Production 
The film was developed under the working title Untitled Marital Crisis Comedy.

Dan Fogelman started writing the screenplay in 2009 about love among a group of people. It is based on his own experiences and was written with Steve Carell in mind. After Fogelman sent it to his manager, within a week Carell read it and came aboard the project. In December 2009, Warner Bros. secured the rights of the then-untitled project for $2.5 million. In January 2010, the film was in pre-production. On March 16, 2010, Emma Stone was in negotiations to star in the film. On April 7, 2010, Lio Tipton was in final talks to appear in the film. On April 12, Kevin Bacon also joined the cast. It is the first project produced by Carell's Carousel Productions.

Principal photography took place in and around Los Angeles, California. Filming started on April 16, 2010 and lasted for 53 days. Locations included Westfield Century City mall, Ventura Boulevard, Hollywood Hills where Jacob's house is located, Taft High School in Woodland Hills, Portola Middle School in Tarzana and Grant High School in Van Nuys, which stood for Robbie and Jessica's campuses, El Torito Grill at the Sherman Oaks Galleria and Equinox Fitness in Woodland Hills, which became the sports club featured in the film. Before editing, the original cut was three hours long.

Release 
The film's release was originally slated for April 22, 2011, but was later changed to July 29, 2011.

Home media 
Crazy, Stupid, Love was released on DVD and Blu-ray on November 6, 2011. DVD sales grossed $19.8 million and Blu-ray sales $5.6 million.

Reception

Box office 

Crazy, Stupid, Love grossed $84.2 million in the United States and Canada and $58.5 million in other countries, for a worldwide total of $142.7 million, against its production of $50 million.

The film opened at No. 5 at the North American box office on its opening weekend with $19.1 million.

Critical response 
On Rotten Tomatoes, the film has an approval rating of 79% based on 235 reviews and an average rating of 6.9/10. The site's critical consensus reads, "It never lives up to the first part of its title, but Crazy, Stupid, Loves unabashed sweetness – and its terrifically talented cast – more than make up for its flaws." On Metacritic, the film has a score of 68 out of 100 based on 40 critics, indicating "generally favorable reviews". Audiences polled by CinemaScore gave the film an average grade of "B+" on an A+ to F scale.

Owen Gleiberman of Entertainment Weekly called it "Nothing more (or less) than an enchanting light comedy of romantic confusion... It's a movie that understands love because it understands pain." He gave it a grade "A". Roger Ebert gave Crazy, Stupid, Love 3 out of 4 stars and remarked that it "is a sweet romantic comedy about good-hearted people". A. O. Scott of The New York Times gave the film 4 out of 5 stars, and wrote: "Crazy, Stupid, Love is, on balance, remarkably sane and reasonably smart". Betsy Sharkey of the Los Angeles Times gave the film a 4 out of 5 review as well and said that it "conjures up the bittersweet magic of first loves, lasting loves, lost loves and all the loves in between".
	
Some reviewers were less favorable, such as Christy Lemire at the Associated Press, who wrote that "it never gets crazy or stupid enough to make you truly fall in love with it", giving the film a 2 out of 4 rating. James Rocchi of MSN Movies was particularly critical, giving it 1 out of 5 and remarking that it is "a star-studded lump of fantasy and falsehood".

Several critics included the film on their end-of-year lists.
Owen Gleiberman of Entertainment Weekly included the film in 8th place on his list.
TV Guide put it in 9th place on its "Best Movies of 2011" list. 
Peter Hartlaub of the San Francisco Chronicle included it in 10th place on his Top 20 list.

Accolades

Notes

References

External links 

 
 
 
 

2011 films
2011 romantic comedy films
2010s English-language films
American romantic comedy films
Films about divorce
Films directed by Glenn Ficarra and John Requa
Films produced by Denise Di Novi
Films scored by Christophe Beck
Films set in Los Angeles
Films shot in Los Angeles
Films with screenplays by Dan Fogelman
Midlife crisis films
Warner Bros. films
2010s American films